Konkyan Township or Kongyan Township is a township located within Laukkaing District, Shan State, Myanmar. It is also part of the Kokang Self-Administered Zone. The capital town is Konkyan.

Geography
It is sharing a border with Laukkaing Township. The remaining area is mainly mountainous.

Rubber, lychee, mango, walnut and pear are grown in this area as poppy substitutes. Sugarcane, pineapple, corn, buckwheat, soybean and various vegetables are also grown.

Further reading
 Topo Map of Kokang Self-Administered Zone - Mimu
 Shan (North) State, Myanmar - Mimu
Konkyan Township - Shan State - Mimu

References

Townships of Shan State